Ravinder Kapoor (15 December 1940 – 3 March 2011), popularly known as Goga Kapoor, was an Indian actor, who appeared mostly in Bollywood films. He has acted in over 120 films, majorly known for playing supporting roles of that of villain's henchmen or that of gangster. He is also remembered for portraying the role of Kans in the popular TV serial Mahabharat, Ravan in TV serial Jai Veer Hanuman, Daku Shaitan Singh in the film Toofan, Dinkar Rao in the 1990 film Agneepath and as the Don in the film Kabhi Haan Kabhi Naa. His other notable works include films such as Qayamat Se Qayamat Tak and Run.

Acting career
Kapoor has worked in many English plays while he started his career. While working in English plays he gradually became a theatre actor. Later when his acting skills got the recognition, he was offered a small but crucial role in Jwala, which was released in 1971. Soon, he started receiving many regional film offers, but later he stopped working in regional films. After two years, he came back to Bollywood with the film Ek Kunwari Ek Kunwara in which he again played a negative role. After this, he mainly portrayed villainous roles. He has also acted in a successful epic serial Mahabharat. His last film was Darwaaza Bandh Rakho.

Death
Kapoor died on 3 March 2011 in Mumbai, aged 70.

Partial filmography

 Jwala (1971)
 Zanjeer (1973)....Goga
 Dukh Bhanjan Tera Naam (1974) as man came to drink water from Sunil Dutt
 Yaadon Ki Baaraat (1973)
 Himalay Se Ooncha (1974)
 Salaakhen (1975)
 Hera Pheri (1976)
 Khoon Pasina (1976)
 Ghata (1978)
 Main Tulsi Tere Aangan Ki(1978) ......Thakur Ajmer Singh 
 Muqaddar Ka Sikandar (1978)Inspector Eagle (1979) as Goga
 Mr. Natwarlal (1979)
Lahu Ke Do Rang (1979)...Goga
 Do Aur Do Paanch(1980).... Jagdish Goon
 Dostana (1980)...Baldev Singh
 Shaan (1980)
Jwalamukhi (1980 film)
 Yaarana (1981)
 Lawaaris (1981)
 Satte Pe Satta (1982)...Rowdy Goon in Bar
 Bemisaal (1982)
 Shakti (1982)...Yashwant
 Kalka (1983 film)...Karamchand
 Maati Maangey Khoon (1984) as Daciat Goga
 Coolie  (1983)...Goga
 Betaab (1983)
 Phoolan Devi...Police Informer  (1985) Bengali Movie 
Sanjhi (1985)
 Arjun (1985)....Ranga
 Saagar (1985)
 Jhoothi(1985).....Babulal
 Mard (1985)
 Muddat(1985)...Public Prosecutor (Lawyer)Aaj Ka Daur (1985)
 Nasamaj(1986)
 Mazloom(1986)...Lawyer Public Prosceutor
Dilwaala (1986)
 Allah Rakha (1986)....Goga
 Jaan Ki Baazi (1986)...Mahendra
Jungle Ki Beti (1987)
 Sadak Chhap(1987)...Goga
 Nayakan (1987) (Tamil)
 Shoorveer (1988)
 Shahenshah (1988)....Defence Lawyer
 Qayamat Se Qayamat Tak (1988)...Randhir Singh
Sagar Sangam (1988)...Thakur
 Aryan (1988) (Malayalam film)
 Ganga Jamuna Saraswati (1988)....Inspector Goga
Billoo Badshah(1989)...Ramchabile Tiwari
Anjaane Rishte(1989)....Lawyer Public Prosecutor 
 Toofan (1989)....Daku Shaitan Singh
 Ilaaka(1989)....Swami
 Agneepath (1990)....Dinkar Rao
 Hatim Tai (1990)
 Thanedaar (1990)...Lawrence
 Jungle Love (1990)
 Ajooba Kudrat Ka (1991)
 Princess from Kathmandu
 Ganga Jamuna Ki Lalkar (1991)
 Patthar Ke Phool (1991)...Durjan
 Khatra (1991)
 Kurbaan (1991)....Daku Panna Singh
  Izzat(1991)....Police Head Constable Ramchandra
 Phool Aur Kaante(1991)....Jagga
   Police Officer(1992)...IG Khanna
 Jigar(1992)....Patil
Tilak (1992)..... Balvant Singh
Apradhi (1992 film)...Damodar
 Phool Aur Angaar(1993)...Head of College Committee
 Kabhi Haan Kabhi Naa (1993)....Anthony Gomes
 Aaj Kie Aurat(1993)...Advocate Satyaprakash
Krishan Avtaar(1993)....Inspector Sawant
Jeevan Ki Shatranj (1993)...Inspector General of Police
 Sholay Aur Toofan (1994)
Insaniyat (1994)....Goga
Salaami(1994)...Police Supritendant Gautam
Cheetah (1994)...DCP Rajeshswar
Aag (1994 film)....Thakur
Rakhwale(1994)...Public Prosecutor,Lawyer
 Main Khiladi Tu Anari (1994)....Damodar
 ''The Don (1995).... Bhandari
  Raja Ki Aayegi Baraat  (1997) ....Lawyer GyanPrakash
 Refugee (2000)
 Raja Ko Rani Se Pyar Ho Gaya (2000)
 Ek Aur Maut (2001)
 Hindustan Ki Kasam (1999)
 Hasina Dacait (2001)
 Run (2004)
 D (2005) as Hashim Bhai
 Darwaaza Bandh Rakho (2006)

Television

References

External links
 

1940 births
2011 deaths
Indian male film actors
Indian male stage actors
Indian male television actors
Male actors from Mumbai
Place of birth missing
Male actors in Hindi cinema
20th-century Indian male actors
Male actors in Malayalam cinema